When the Night is Over is a collaboration album by Little Louie Vega and Marc Anthony, released in 1991. The album was done by the Masters at Work. It is also Marc Anthony's first album as an artist previously releasing a single-only record "Rebel". The album produced one single, "Ride on the Rhythm", which topped the dance music charts.

Track listing 

 Ride on the Rhythm (4:04)
 When the Night is Over (5:41)
 Walk Away (4:44)
 If I Had the Opportunity (4:34)
 Let Me Love You (4:57)
 It's Alright (4:05)
 The Name of the Game (6:04)
 Living in a Strange World (5:35)
 Time (5:43)
 The Masters at Work (4:25)
 Ride (6:39)

Reception

John Bush of Allmusic praised the album as being a fusion of house music and salsa and called the single "Ride on the Rhythm" as worth the cost of the CD alone.

References

1991 debut albums
Collaborative albums
Marc Anthony albums